Melicoccus is a genus of ten species of flowering plants in the family Sapindaceae, native to tropical regions of northern and western South America.

The fruit is a drupe. Several species, but principally M. bijugatus, are widely cultivated in their native areas and elsewhere in Central America and the Caribbean for their fruit.

Some species of the related genus Talisia are sometimes included in Melicoccus.

Species
Melicoccus antioquensis Acevedo-Rodríguez — Colombia
Melicoccus aymardii Acevedo-Rodríguez — Venezuela
Melicoccus bijugatus Jacq. – Mamoncillo (Colombia, Venezuela)
Melicoccus espritosantensis Acevedo-Rodríguez — eastern Brazil
Melicoccus jimenezii (Alain) Acevedo-Rodríguez — Dominican Republic
Melicoccus lepidopetalus Radlk. – Motoyoé or Yva Povo (Bolivia, Brazil, Paraguay), Argentina
Melicoccus novogranatensis Acevedo-Rodríguez — Colombia and Ecuador
Melicoccus oliviformis HBK — Mexico, Central and South America and Trinidad
Melicoccus pedicellaris (Sagot ex Radlk.) Acevedo-Rodríguez Suriname, French Guiana and Brazil
Melicoccus petiolutatus Acevedo-Rodríguez — Peru

Taxonomy 
The genus Melicoccus was first described by Patrick Browne, an Irish doctor and botanist, in 1756. This description was based on M. bijugatus trees which were cultivated in Jamaica. In 1760, Nikolaus Joseph von Jacquin described the first species in Browne's genus, which he named M. bijugatus. In 1762 Linnaeus used a spelling variation of the name Melicocca bijuga. Over the next two centuries, Linnaeus' spelling variation was used in almost all publications. A proposal was made in 1994 to conserve Melicocca over Melicoccus, but the proposal was rejected, leading to a restoration of the original version of the name.

In 1888 German taxonomist Ludwig Radlkofer placed Melicoccus in the tribe Melicocceae together with eight other genera. In his monograph on the Neotropical members of the tribe (Talisia and Melicoccus) Pedro Acevedo-Rodríguez suggested that although Talisia and Melicoccus appeared to form a monophyletic group, the other (Old World) genera probably did not belong to the same lineage.

References

New World Fruits Database: Melicoccus lepidopetalus

Sapindaceae genera
Sapindaceae